Pseudomonadota (synonym Proteobacteria) is a major phylum of Gram-negative bacteria. The renaming of several prokaryote phyla in 2021, including Pseudomonadota, remains controversial among microbiologists, many of whom continue to use the earlier name Proteobacteria, of long standing in the literature. The phylum Proteobacteria includes a wide variety of pathogenic genera, such as Escherichia, Salmonella, Vibrio, Yersinia, Legionella, and many others. Others are free-living (non-parasitic) and include many of the bacteria responsible for nitrogen fixation.

Carl Woese established this grouping in 1987, calling it informally the "purple bacteria and their relatives". Because of the great diversity of forms found in this group, it was later informally named Proteobacteria, after Proteus, a Greek god of the sea capable of assuming many different shapes (not after the Proteobacteria genus Proteus). In 2021 the International Committee on Systematics of Prokaryotes designated the synonym Pseudomonadota.

Characteristics
All Pseudomonadota (Proteobacteria) are diverse. They are nominally Gram-negative, although in practice some may actually stain Gram-positive or Gram-variable. Their outer membrane is mainly composed of lipopolysaccharides. Many move about using flagella, but some are nonmotile, or rely on bacterial gliding.

Pseudomonadota have a wide variety of metabolism types. Most are facultatively or obligately anaerobic, chemolithoautotrophic, and heterotrophic, but numerous exceptions occur. A variety of genera, which are not closely related to each other, convert energy from light through conventional photosynthesis or anoxygenic photosynthesis.

Pseudomonadota are associated with the imbalance of the microbiotic community in the lower reproductive tract of women. These species are associated with inflammation.  

Some Alphaproteobacteria can grow at very low levels of nutrients and have unusual morphology such as stalks and buds. Others include agriculturally important bacteria capable of inducing nitrogen fixation in symbiosis with plants. The type order is the Caulobacterales, comprising stalk-forming bacteria such as Caulobacter. The mitochondria of eukaryotes are thought to be descendants of an alphaproteobacterium.

The Betaproteobacteria are highly metabolically diverse and contain chemolithoautotrophs, photoautotrophs, and generalist heterotrophs. The type order is the Burkholderiales, comprising an enormous range of metabolic diversity, including opportunistic pathogens.

The Gammaproteobacteria are the largest class in terms of species with validly published names. The type order is the Pseudomonadales, which include the genera Pseudomonas and the nitrogen-fixing Azotobacter.

The Zetaproteobacteria are iron-oxidizing neutrophilic chemolithoautotrophs, distributed worldwide in estuaries and marine habitats. The type order is the Mariprofundales.

The Hydrogenophilalia are obligate thermophiles and include heterotrophs and autotrophs. The type order is the Hydrogenophilales.

The Acidithiobacillia contain only sulfur, iron, and uranium-oxidising autotrophs. The type order is the Acidithiobacillales, which includes economically important organisms used in the mining industry such as Acidithiobacillus spp.

Taxonomy
The currently accepted taxonomy is based on the List of Prokaryotic names with Standing in Nomenclature (LSPN) and the National Center for Biotechnology Information (NCBI).

The group is defined primarily in terms of ribosomal RNA (rRNA) sequences. The Pseudomonadota are divided into several classes. These were previously regarded as subclasses of the phylum, but they are now treated as classes.
These classes are monophyletic. The genus Acidithiobacillus, part of the Gammaproteobacteria until it was transferred to class Acidithiobacillia in 2013, was previously regarded as paraphyletic to the Betaproteobacteria according to multigenome alignment studies. In 2017, the Betaproteobacteria was subject to major revisions and the class Hydrogenophilalia was created to contain the order Hydrogenophilales

Pseudomonadota classes with validly published names include some prominent genera: e.g.:
 Acidithiobacillia: Acidithiobacillus, Thermithiobacillus
 Alphaproteobacteria: Brucella, Rhizobium, Agrobacterium, Caulobacter, Rickettsia, Wolbachia, etc.
 Betaproteobacteria: Bordetella, Ralstonia, Neisseria, Nitrosomonas, etc.
 Gammaproteobacteria: Escherichia, Shigella, Salmonella, Yersinia, Buchnera, Haemophilus, Vibrio, Pseudomonas, etc.
 Zetaproteobacteria: Mariprofundus

Transformation

Transformation, a process in which genetic material passes from one bacterium to another, has been reported in at least 30 species of Pseudomonadota distributed in the classes alpha, beta, and gamma.  The best-studied Pseudomonadota with respect to natural genetic transformation are the medically important human pathogens Neisseria gonorrhoeae (class beta), and Haemophilus influenzae (class gamma). Natural genetic transformation is a sexual process involving DNA transfer from one bacterial cell to another through the intervening medium and the integration of the donor sequence into the recipient genome. In pathogenic Pseudomonadota, transformation appears to serve as a DNA repair process that protects the pathogen's DNA from attack by their host's phagocytic defenses that employ oxidative free radicals.

See also
 List of bacteria genera
 List of bacterial orders

References

External links

 Pseudomonadota information from Palaeos. 
 Pseudomonadota. – J. P. Euzéby: List of Prokaryotic names with Standing in Nomenclature.

 
Gram-negative bacteria
Bacteria phyla